Vegas Showdown is a board game for players aged 12 and above in which players compete to build the most impressive casino in Las Vegas.

External links
 Vegas Showdown official site
 Licensed online game at GameTable Online
 
 Review of the game at Age of Boards

Avalon Hill games
Auction board games
Board games introduced in 2005
Economic simulation board games
Tile-laying board games